The following is a list of the winners of the World Mixed Doubles Curling Championship since the inception of the championship in 2008. Doubles is a discipline of curling in which a team of two competes with six stones, instead of the traditional team of four with eight stones. Mixed doubles specifies that the team consist of one man and one woman.

Medalists

See also
World Curling Championships
List of World Men's Curling Champions
List of World Women's Curling Champions
List of Olympic medalists in curling
List of Paralympic medalists in wheelchair curling

References
General
World Curling Federation results index
Specific

World Mixed Doubles Curling Championship
Curling-related lists
Curling